The Men's team sprint event of the FIS Nordic World Ski Championships 2017 was held on 26 February 2017.

Results

Semifinals
The semifinals were started at 12:20.

Semifinal A

Semifinal B

Final
The final was started at 14:00.

References

External links
Results Semifinals - langrenn.com (In Norwegian)

Men's team sprint